Crataegus arborea, the Montgomery hawthorn, is a North American species of hawthorn, native to the eastern United States. It is a shrub or small tree.

Distribution
Crataegus arborea is found in Alabama, Arkansas, Florida, Indiana, Missouri, Ohio, Tennessee, and West Virginia.

References

arborea
Flora of the Eastern United States
Plants described in 1902
Trees of the Northeastern United States
Endemic flora of the United States
Flora without expected TNC conservation status